Aquaphilus is a genus of bacteria from the family of Neisseriaceae with one known species (Aquaphilus dolomiae).

References

Further reading 
 
 

Neisseriales
Bacteria genera
Monotypic bacteria genera